Café Sperl is a traditional Viennese café located at Gumpendorfer Straße 11 in the Mariahilf sixth district of Vienna, Austria. The café is on the Austrian Register of Historic Places.

History
Jacob Ronacher founded the cafe as Café Ronacher in 1880, in a building on the corner of Gumpendorfer Straße and the Lehargasse (Lehar Lane). The decor is reminiscent of Vienna's elegant Ringstraßen-Cafés with parquet floors, bentwood Thonet chairs, marble tables, crystal chandeliers and carambole billiards tables. The building and interior decor were designed by architects Wilhelm Jelinek and Anton Groß. Within the first year of operation, Ronacher sold the establishment to the Sperl family, who renamed the business Café Sperl. In 1884 ownership passed to Adolf Kratochwilla, who retained the cafe's name.

Prior to World War I, the primary clientele was an interesting mix of individuals drawn from Vienna's cultural and military circles. In addition to authors, artists, architects, composers, musicians and actors, military officials from the nearby Imperial and Royal (K.u.K) military academy could be found in attendance, including the future Chief of Staff of the Austro-Hungarian Army Franz Conrad von Hötzendorf and Archduke Joseph Ferdinand.

In 1968 Manfred Staub bought the cafe from the Kratochwillas. He renovated the cafe in 1983. In recent years, the Cafe Sperl has won several awards. These include the "Austrian Cafe of the Year," 1998 (German: Österreichisches Kaffeehaus des Jahres) and the Goldene Kaffeebohne (English: Golden Coffee Bean) in 2004. Contemporary cafe regulars have included authors Jörg Mauthe, Robert Menasse, Ana Tajder, and Michael Köhlmeier.

In popular media

Café Sperl was featured in the 1995 movie Before Sunrise, starring Ethan Hawke and Julie Delpy, and in a 2011 DVD of the Vienna Philharmonic playing the music of Johann Strauss, Fritz Kreisler and others. The café interior also appeared in the 2011 movie A Dangerous Method, which featured Viggo Mortensen and Michael Fassbender. The interior and exterior appear in the miniseries The Winds of War.

See also
 List of restaurants in Vienna

Further reading 
 Felix Czeike: Historisches Lexikon Wien. Band 1. Verlag Kremayr & Scheriau, Wien 1992, .
 Hans Veigl: Wiener Kaffeehausführer. Kremayr und Scheriau, Wien 1994, .

External links 

 Homepage of the Café Sperl (German language)

Coffeehouses and cafés in Vienna
Buildings and structures in Mariahilf